Mangrovimonas xylaniphaga is a bacterium from the genus of Mangrovimonas which has been isolated from mangrove sediments from the Matang Mangrove Forest in Perak.

References

Flavobacteria
Bacteria described in 2017